The Clementi Mall (Chinese 金文泰广场）is a shopping mall in Clementi, Singapore, at Clementi Town Centre. It is a five-storey mall with 290,000 square feet of retail space. It opened for business in January 2011, with the grand official opening in May that year. The mall is owned by CM Domain. Above the mall is Clementi Towers, the first HDB project to be co-located within a shopping mall and bus interchange.

The mall hosts 135 retail outlets including 16 restaurants and cafes. Anchor tenants include Best Denki, BHG Department Store (closed on 6 March 2022) and NTUC FairPrice Finest. The Clementi Public Library is located in the mall, as is the office of the West Coast Town Council. The branch office of Singapore Post, previously located at Block 443, is also located at Level 5.

Transport connections
The Clementi Bus Interchange has direct access to the mall and the existing Clementi MRT station is linked directly to the mall at Level 3.

References

External links
 

2011 establishments in Singapore
Shopping malls established in 2011
Shopping malls in Singapore
Singapore Press Holdings
Clementi